Marmaduke was a 40-gun fourth rate vessel of the Kingdom of England, Her initial commission was as a Royalist vessel during the English Civil War named Revenge. She defected to the Parliamentarians then commissioned as Marmaduke. During the First Anglo-Dutch War she partook in the Battle of The Gabbard. During the Second Anglo-Dutch War she participated in the Four Days' Fight. She was scuttled during the Dutch raid on the Medway and sold in 1669.

Marmaduke was the only named vessel in the English or Royal Navy.

Revenge was the second named vessel since it was used for a 46-gun galleon, launched in October 1577, captured by Spanish squadron off Azores 31 August 1591 and foundered on 5 September 1591.

Specifications
She was purchased as the mercantile Marmaduke (built 1643) by the Royalists, then deserted to the Parliamentarians in 1652. Her builder's measure tonnage was calculated as  tons.

Her gun armament originally was 42 guns. In 1653 she carried 40 guns the 32 guns in 1660. In 1666 her armament was 42 (wartime)/34 (peacetime) and consisted of twelve culverins, twenty-two demi-culverines, eight sakers. Her manning was 160 personnel in 1653, then dropped to 110 in 1660 then in the 1666 establishment it was 160/120/100 personnel.

Commissioned Service

Service in the English Civil War and Commonwealth Navy
She was commissioned as Revenge into Royalist Navy under Captain Thomas Price in 1651 then in early 1652 under Captain Philip Marshall. She defected to the Parliamentary Navy on 31 May 1652, after a mutiny in April. She was purchased by the Parliamentarians on 5 June 1652. she was commissioned as Marmaduke into the Parliamentary Navy in 1652 under the command of Captain John Bonner.

First Anglo-Dutch War
In early 1653 she was under Captain Edward Blagg. As a member of Red Squadron, Center Division she took part in the Battle of the Gabbard on 2–3 June 1653. on 31 July 1653 as a member of Red Squadron, Center Division she participated in the Battle of Scheveningen. Later in 1853 she was under the command of Captain Jonathan Grove. 1655 brought a new commander, Captain William Godfrey for the Irish Station. She was repaired at Deptford in 1657. In 1658 she was under Captain Peter Butler sailing with a convoy of East India ships to St Helena in 1659 and returning with a home bound convoy.

Service after the Restoration May 1660
She was repaired at Portsmouth between 1661 and 1662. On 7 April 1664 she was under the command of Captain John Best.

Second Anglo-Dutch War
She participated in the Battle of Lowestoft as a member of Blue Squadron, Van Division on 3 June 1665. Captain Bestdied on 15 November 1665. She again was under command of Captain Godfrey on 1 January 1666. As a member of Red Squadron, Van Division she took part in the Four Days' Battle on 1–4 June 1666. During the battle she suffered 10 killed and 31 wounded.

Disposition
Marmaduke was scuttled in June 1667 during the Dutch raid on the Medway. She could not be salvaged and then sold to Thomas Gould for £151 on 22 June 1669.

Notes

Citations

References

 British Warships in the Age of Sail (1603 – 1714), by Rif Winfield, published by Seaforth Publishing, England © Rif Winfield 2009, EPUB :
 Fleet Actions, 1.7 Battle of the Gabbard (North Foreland)
 Fleet Actions, 1.8 Battle of Scheveningen (off Texel)
 Fleet Actions, 3.1 Battle of Lowestoft
 Fleet Actions, 3.3 Battle of the Galloper Sand (the Four Days' Battle)
 Chapter 4 Fourth Rates - 'Small Ships', Vessels acquired from 25 March 1603, Ex-Royalist Prizes (1649-52), Marmaduke
 Ships of the Royal Navy, by J.J. Colledge, revised and updated by Lt-Cdr Ben Warlow and Steve Bush, published by Seaforth Publishing, Barnsley, Great Britain, © the estate of J.J. Colledge, Ben Warlow and Steve Bush 2020, EPUB , Section M (Marmaduke), Section R (Revenge)
 The Arming and Fitting of English Ships of War 1800 - 1815, by Brian Lavery, published by US Naval Institute Press © Brian Lavery 1989, Part V Guns, Type of Guns

Ships of the line of the Royal Navy
1600s ships
Ships of the English navy